Acer longipes is an Asian species of maple. It has been found only in China (Chongqing, Guangxi, Henan, Hunan, Hubei, Jiangxi, Shaanxi).

Acer longipes is a small tree up to 10 meters tall, with purple bark. Leaves are non-compound, thin and papery, up to 14 cm wide and 15 cm across, usually with 3 lobes but occasionally 5 or none.

References

External links

line drawing for Flora of China drawings 2 + 3 at top

longipes
Plants described in 1905
Flora of China